Plinio Apuleyo Mendoza (born January 1, 1932) is a Colombian journalist, writer, and diplomat. Mendoza was named in honour to the Roman authors Pliny the Younger and Apuleius.

Career
Plinio Apuleyo Mendoza born in Tunja, Boyacá in 1932, son of the lawyer and politic Plinio Mendoza Neira, who was witness to the murder of Jorge Eliécer Gaitán. He studied political science at Sorbonne in Paris.

Mendoza had a close friendship with Nobel Prize winner Gabriel García Márquez. They spent time in Europe during the early 60s. Mendoza published a biographical novel regarding the life and anecdotes of García Márquez and their circle of friends, poets, and writers during those years in Europe. The book was entitled "The Fragrance of the Guava".
Mendoza served as First Secretary of the Colombian Embassy in France, writing newspaper articles for several international publications at the same time. After returning to Colombia in 1959, he became a full-time writer and journalist.

Works

Short stories 
 The Deserter. Short Stories. 1974
 The day that we buried the weapons. 2014

Novels 
 Vanishing years. 1979
 Five days at the island. 1997
 Between two waters. 2010

Non-fiction 
 The flame and the ice. 1984
 People, places: selection of articles written in Europe and America. 1986
 Fire zones: the guerrilla in Colombia, reportage and analysis.
 Our painters in Paris. 1989
 The challenges of the power: open letter to former Colombian presidents. 1991
 The sun continues rising. 1994
 Those times with Gabo, 2000, extension of one of the chapters of 1984
 Wind time: portraits, mementos, 2002
 An unknown García Márquez, 2009
 Many things to tell, 2012
 Gabo: letters and mementos, 2013, an extension of the 2000 book
 The country of my father, 2013

As co-author 
 The Fragrance of Guava. 1982 with Gabriel García Márquez
 Guide to the Perfect Latin American Idiot. 1996. With Carlos Alberto Montaner and Álvaro Vargas Llosa
 Manufacturers of misery: politicians, priests, soldiers, businessmen, unions ..., 1998, with Carlos Alberto Montaner and Alvaro Vargas Llosa
 The Return of the Idiot, 2007, with Carlos Alberto Montaner and Alvaro Vargas Llosa
 Latest news of the new Spanish American Idiot, 2014, with Carlos Alberto Montaner and Alvaro Vargas Llosa

References

1932 births
Living people
Colombian male writers
Colombian journalists
Male journalists
Colombian diplomats